Stull is a surname. Notable people with the surname include:

Bill Stull, American football player
Bob Stull, American college athletics administrator
Deforest Stull, American football and basketball coach
Everett Stull, American baseball player
Howard William Stull, American politician
Mari Stull, American lobbyist and blogger
Michael J. Stull, American singer-songwriter
Nelle Brooke Stull, American activist
Olive Griffith Stull, American herpetologist
Paul S. Stull, American politician
Rob Stull, American modern pentathlete and fencer
Walter Stull, American actor and director

See also
Stull